L’aut’journal is a French language newspaper distributed in Quebec freely and through subscription. It was founded in 1984 by political scientist and journalist Pierre Dubuc, and as of 2004 has a circulation of 35,000 copies.

It advocates Quebec sovereignty, democratic socialism and feminism, and strongly supports labour unions, from whom it receives most of its funding.

Many personalities voluntarily contribute to l’aut’journal, including:

Élaine Audet
Mario Beaulieu
Roméo Bouchard
André Bouthillier
Michel Chartrand
Michel Chossudovsky
Paul Cliche
Jean-Claude Germain
Michel Lapierre
Marc Laviolette
François Parenteau
Paul Rose
Charles Castonguay

See also
List of Quebec media
List of newspapers in Canada

External links
L’aut’journal sur le Web (in French)

Newspapers published in Montreal
Quebec sovereigntist media
French-language newspapers published in Quebec
Publications established in 1984
1984 establishments in Quebec